Talışlı is a village in the municipality of Haftoni in the Lankaran Rayon of Azerbaijan.

References

Populated places in Lankaran District